Megalopyge is a genus of moths in the family Megalopygidae.

Species
Megalopyge affinis (Druce, 1887)
Megalopyge albicollis (Walker, 1855)
Megalopyge amita Schaus, 1900
Megalopyge amitina Dognin, 1912
Megalopyge apicalis (Herrich-Schäffer, 1856)
Megalopyge braulio Schaus
Megalopyge brunneipennis (Schaus, 1905)
Megalopyge chrysocoma (Herrich-Schäffer, 1856)
Megalopyge crispata (Packard, 1864)
Megalopyge defoliata (Walker, 1855)
Megalopyge dyari Hopp, 1935
Megalopyge hina (Dognin, 1911)
Megalopyge hyalina (Schaus, 1905)
Megalopyge immaculata (Cassino, 1928)
Megalopyge inca Hopp, 1935
Megalopyge krugii (Dewitz, 1897)
Megalopyge lacyi (Barnes & McDunnough, 1910)
Megalopyge lampra Dyar, 1910
Megalopyge lanata (Stoll, 1780)
Megalopyge lanceolata Dognin, 1923
Megalopyge lapena Schaus, 1896
Megalopyge lecca (Druce, 1890)
Megalopyge megalopygae (Schaus, 1905)
Megalopyge nuda (Stoll, 1789)
Megalopyge obscura (Schaus, 1905)
Megalopyge opercularis (Smith & Abbot, 1797)
Megalopyge ovata (Schaus, 1896)
Megalopyge perseae (Dognin, 1891)
Megalopyge peruana Hopp, 1935
Megalopyge pixidifera (Smith & Abbot, 1797)
Megalopyge ravida (Druce, 1887)
Megalopyge radiata Schaus, 1892
Megalopyge salebrosa (Clemens, 1860)
Megalopyge tharops (Stoll, 1782)
Megalopyge torva Schaus, 1912
Megalopyge trossula (Dognin, 1891)
Megalopyge trujillina Dyar, 1910
Megalopyge undulata (Herrich-Schäffer, 1858)
Megalopyge urens Berg, 1882
Megalopyge uruguayensis Berg, 1882
Megalopyge victoriana Schaus, 1927
Megalopyge vulpina Schaus, 1900
Megalopyge xanthopasa (Sepp, 1828)

Selected former species
Megalopyge orsilochus (Cramer, [1775])

References

Megalopygidae
Megalopygidae genera